Double Cup is the first studio album by footwork musician DJ Rashad, and the sole full-length released during his lifetime. It was released on October 20, 2013 via Hyperdub. The cover features a nighttime aerial shot of Chicago, Rashad's hometown.

Reception

Double Cup has received some acclaim from music critics. At Metacritic, which assigns a normalized rating out of 100 to reviews from mainstream critics, the album received an average score of 79 based on 13 reviews, indicating "generally favorable reviews".

Pitchfork placed "Double Cup" at number 35 on their 2014 list of "100 Best Albums of the Decade So Far" and at number 20 on their 2019 list of "The 200 Best Albums of the 2010s".

Track listing

References

2013 albums
DJ Rashad albums
Hyperdub albums